Mark Knowles and Roger Smith won in the final 4–6, 6–2, 7–6 against Jim Grabb and Michael Tebbutt.

Seeds
Champion seeds are indicated in bold text while text in italics indicates the round in which those seeds were eliminated.

 Mark Keil /  Jeff Tarango (quarterfinals)
 Jim Grabb /  Michael Tebbutt (final)
 Piet Norval /  Marcos Ondruska (first round)
 Kent Kinnear /  Dave Randall (semifinals)

Draw

External links
 ATP draw

Kingfisher Airlines Tennis Open
1996 ATP Tour